Gun in game topics may refer to:

 Gungame (disambiguation), gunning games
 Game gun (disambiguation), guns for games
 Gun (disambiguation), for gaming topics named "Gun"

See also
 Space Gun (video game), a video game named "Space Gun"
 Gun fu, a fictional martial art that uses guns as its focal weapon, used in fictional games of guns
 Game (disambiguation)